Chandrahasa is a 1933 Hindi mythological costume drama film directed by Sarvottam Badami. It was the first Hindi film directed by Badami bringing him into prominence, even though he did not know Hindi. It was also one of the first Talkie versions of the film which was remade several times. Produced by Sagar Movietone, it had music composed by S. P. Rane. The film starred Noor Mohammed Charlie, Gulzar, Kamala, Master Bachchu, Dinkar, Mehboob Khan and Baburao Sansare.

The film was not a comedy in spite of Charlie, a well-known comedian acting in this film, Badami went on to be recognised later for his satirical comedies.

The story is about a young man Chandrahasa, whom an evil Minister is trying to kill. A princess helps Chandrahasa, falling in love with him in the process.

Plot
An evil minister wants to kill the young boy Chandrahasa who escapes the minister's killers. Several years later the minister finds Chandrahasa and sends him as a messenger to the king with a letter. The letter asks the king to poison the messenger. On the way a young princess finds him sleeping and reads the letter. She rewords the letter and changes Vish (poison) to Vishya, which is her name. The king on receiving the letter gets Chandrahasa married to the princess.

Cast
 Noor Mohammed Charlie
 Gulzar
 Master Bachchu
 Kamala
 Baburao Sansare
 Khatoon
Mehboob Khan

Remakes
The Film has been made several times since 1921.

 Chandrahasa (1921) directed by Kanjibhai Rathod
 Chandrahasa (1928) directed by Kanjibhai Rathod
 Chandrahasa (1929) directed by Dadasaheb Phalke
 Chandrahasa (1933) Hindi, directed by Sarvottam Badami
 Chandrahasan (1936) Tamil, directed by Prafulla Ghosh
 Chandrahasa (1941) Telugu, directed by M. L. Rangaiah
 Chandrahasa (1947) Hindi, directed by Gunjal
 Chandrahasa (1947) directed by S. Patil
 Chandrahasa (1965) Telugu, directed by B. S. Ranga

Music
The music direction was by S. P. Rane.

Soundtrack

References

External links

 Chandrahasa (1933) on indiancine.ma

1933 films
1930s Hindi-language films
Indian black-and-white films
Films directed by Sarvottam Badami